Max Faulkner was an English stuntman and actor.

Career
Max Faulkner did stunt/double work in The Adventures of Robin Hood and appeared as a clerk in one episode but was mainly known for his credited work on Doctor Who during the 1970s where he appeared in The Ambassadors of Death (as a UNIT soldier), The Monster of Peladon (as a miner), Planet of the Spiders (as a Guard Captain), Genesis of the Daleks (as a Thal Guard), The Android Invasion (as Corporal Adams), The Sun Makers as one of Mandrel's rebels, and The Invasion of Time (as Nesbin).  He also served as the fight arranger for The Hand of Fear.

Selected filmography

I Was Monty's Double (1958) - British Sentry (uncredited)
A Night to Remember (1958) - Steward (uncredited)
Carve Her Name with Pride (1958) - German officer in train corridor (uncredited)
Danger Within (1959) - Hamlet Play POW (uncredited)
The Giant Behemoth (1959) - PLA Radio Operator (uncredited)
Gorgo (1960) - Messenger (uncredited)
Out of the Shadow (1961) 
The Third Alibi (1961) - Det. Sgt. Fred Smith (uncredited)
Crosstrap (1962) - Ricky
The Silent Invasion (1962) - Curt
Gang War (1962) - Chuck
Richard the Lionheart (1962-1963, TV Series) - De Fleury
That Kind of Girl (1963) - Johnson
Dr. Crippen (1963) - Radio Officer Andrews (uncredited)
The Ipcress File (1965) - Prison Guard
The Intelligence Men (1965) - Stagehand (uncredited)
The Brigand of Kandahar (1965) - Various Soldiers (uncredited)
Bedazzled (1967) - Priest (uncredited)
Hammerhead (1968) - Security Service Man (uncredited)
Salt and Pepper (1968) - Lieutenant
Star! (1968) - Corp. Cooper (uncredited)
Where Eagles Dare (1968) - Oberschutze (uncredited)
Perfect Friday (1970) - Strong Room Guard
See No Evil (1971) - Steve's Man #1
The Day of the Jackal (1973) - Special Branch Detective (uncredited)
Carry On Dick (1974) - Highwayman (uncredited)
Trial by Combat (1976) - Sir Harold Carslake
The Bawdy Adventures of Tom Jones (1976) - Gentleman of the Hunt (uncredited)
Tarka the Otter (1979) - Ferreter
Top Secret! (1984) - East German Dignitary (uncredited)
GoldenEye (1995) - Guard at Helicopter Show (uncredited) (final film role)

External links

1931 births
2010 deaths
English stunt performers
English male actors
Place of birth missing